As of present, there are around 400 protected areas in Pakistan that are recognized by IUCN. The total protected land area represents 13% of Pakistan's landmass as of 2020, The Government of Pakistan plans to increase it to at least 15% by 2023.

Statistics

IUCN categories

Types of protected areas

National parks

Wildlife sanctuaries

Game reserves

Protected wetlands

Protected and reserved forests

Biosphere reserves

See also
List of zoos in Pakistan
Geography of Pakistan
Forestry in Pakistan
Wildlife of Pakistan
Tourism in Pakistan
Conservation in Pakistan
Environmental issues in Pakistan
World Database on Protected Areas
List of types of formally designated forests

References

Pakistan profile at World Database on Protected Areas
Marine and coastal protected areas of Pakistan
Ramsar wetlands of Pakistan

Further reading
Country profile at Earthtrends
Review of 'Protected Areas System' in Pakistan
Protected areas systems at wildlifeofpakistan.com

External links
IUCN-Pakistan

 
Geography of Pakistan
Pak